Pierre-Charles Comte (23 April 1823 – 30 November 1895) was a French painter. He was born in Lyon and died in Fontainebleau. He studied under Claude Bonnefond in Lyon and Joseph-Nicolas Robert-Fleury in Paris. His works include The Oath of Henri de Guise and The Coronation of Inês de Castro in 1361.

Gallery

Sources

Artists from Lyon
1823 births
1895 deaths
19th-century French painters